62nd parallel may refer to:

62nd parallel north, a circle of latitude in the Northern Hemisphere
62nd parallel south, a circle of latitude in the Southern Hemisphere